Visa requirements for Emirati citizens are administrative entry restrictions by the authorities of other states placed on citizens of the United Arab Emirates (UAE).

As of January 2023, Emirati citizens had visa-free or visa on arrival access to 178 countries and territories, ranking the Emirati passport 13th in terms of travel freedom according to the Henley Passport Index. All other passports from the 'Arab world' had a lower ranking in this respect . The Emirati passport is one of five passports with the greatest ranking improvement in the 2006-2016 time period.

Emirati citizens do not need a visa to enter other Gulf Cooperation Council (GCC) countries and also have the right to work in those countries. Similarly, citizens of other GCC states do not need a visa to enter the UAE. GCC citizens can use a GCC national identity card (rather than a passport) to enter the UAE.

History
Visa requirements for Emirati citizens were lifted by New Zealand (in July 1999), 
Brunei (11 October 2003), 
Kyrgyzstan (July 2012), Kazakhstan (July 2014), the Schengen Area countries (7 May 2015), 
Belarus (30 April 2016), 
Moldova (24 March 2017),
São Tomé and Príncipe (25 April 2017), 
Argentina (16 May 2017),
Chad and Saint Lucia in October 2017, 
Nauru (19 November 2017), 
Solomon Islands (19 November 2017), 
Chile (16 December 2017), 
Rwanda (30 December 2017), 
Ukraine (31 December 2017), China (16 January 2018), 
Burkina Faso (30 January 2018), Ireland (31 January 2018),
Uruguay (5 April 2018), 
Tonga (24 May 2018), 
Honduras (25 May 2018), 
Brazil (2 June 2018),
Canada (5 June 2018),
Barbados (1 July 2018), Mexico (31 October 2018), Russia (17 February 2019), Uzbekistan (20 March 2019)
South Africa (15 August 2019),
Paraguay (16 August 2019), Central African Republic (8 October 2019), Kiribati (23 October 2019), Israel (22 October 2020), Peru (8 November 2020), and Japan (28 September 2022).

The first possibility of electronic visas for Emirati citizens began with the United Kingdom's electronic visa waiver (EVW) program that commenced on 1 January 2014, 
followed by India in November 2014, Lesotho on 1 May 2017, Benin on 1 January 2018, Uzbekistan on 15 July 2018, Tanzania on 26 November 2018, and Pakistan on 14 March 2019.

Visas on arrival for UAE citizens were introduced by Gabon in October 2017, Guinea on 19 April 2018,
Guyana on 28 May 2018, Mongolia on 15 May 2019 and Equatorial Guinea on 28 July 2019.

Visa requirements map

Visa requirements

Dependent, disputed, or restricted territories
Unrecognized or partially recognized countries

Dependent and autonomous territories

Non-visa restrictions

See also

 Visa policy of the United Arab Emirates
 Emirati passport

References and notes
References

Notes

Emirati citizens
Foreign relations of the United Arab Emirates